The Provincial League (1936–1937) was a league competition for speedway teams in the United Kingdom. The Provincial League was created as a second tier to the National League in 1936 but was renamed National League Division Two in 1938. The 'Provincial League' name was re-used for a breakaway league from the National League in 1960.

Champions

See also
List of United Kingdom Speedway League Champions

References

Speedway leagues
Speedway competitions in the United Kingdom
1936 in British motorsport
1937 in British motorsport
Prov
Prov
Sports leagues established in 1936
Sports leagues disestablished in 1937